The Action off Noordhinder Bank on 1 May 1915 was a naval engagement between four British naval trawlers, supported by a flotilla of four destroyers and a pair of German torpedo boats from the Flanders Flotilla. The action began when the two torpedo boats were sent to rescue the crew of a reconnaissance seaplane that had been forced to alight by engine trouble and to attack the trawlers. The Germans engaged the trawlers; British destroyers from the Harwich Force appeared; the German ships tried to escape but were sunk.

The loss of the two torpedo boats greatly demoralised the German flotilla at Flanders, as they were new. The loss of the two s showed the commanders of the Imperial German Navy that the Flanders Flotilla was inadequately armed to protect the coast, let alone harass British shipping in the English Channel. After similar defeats, the A-class torpedo boats were relegated to coastal patrol and heavier s were transferred to the flotilla.

Background

After the 7th Torpedo Boat Half Flotilla was lost during the Battle off Texel (17 October 1914) German naval authorities were reluctant to commit forces for offensive operations off the coast of Flanders. Admiral Ludwig von Schröder, the commander of Marine Corps Flanders, kept pressure on the German naval command for the transfer of a force of submarines and torpedo boats to his command.

The torpedo boats had been designed in late 1914, built at Hamburg and transported, in sections, overland to Antwerp, like the UB and UC coastal submarines. The Flanders Torpedo Boat Flotilla, based in Zeebrugge, was formed on 28 April 1915. Comprising 15 of the A-class boats, rather than the anticipated 50, the flotilla was put under the command of  Hermann Schoemann.

Prelude

Loss of HMS Recruit

At  Recruit was hit by a torpedo from the UB-6. The destroyer broke in two and sank at once; only 26 members of the crew were rescued by a Dutch ship. Brazen and one of the Harwich trawlers began an abortive search for the submarine until  by when they had returned to the Noordhinder light.

Four trawlers from Great Yarmouth were searching for a U-boat reported in the area the day before. The trawler Barbados which carried the flotilla commander, Lieutenant Sir James Domville RN, the senior ship of the four, was to the west-north-west, beyond Columbia. At about the same time that Recruit was torpedoed, Columbia was attacked by another U-boat at Thornton Ridge off the Scheldt estuary but the torpedo missed.

German sortie

Early on 1 May 1915, two German seaplanes departed Zeebrugge to reconnoitre the Thames but one of the aircraft had engine trouble and made a forced landing. The other seaplane crew reported four British trawlers off Noordhinder Bank, north of Ostend. The crew of the seaplane were rescued by a Dutch freighter and taken to the Noordhinder lightship, whence they were returned to land by a U-boat.

Action
At about  the two torpedo boats, A2 and A6, were seen heading towards the British trawlers from the west-south-west, with no flags visible. At about  range they ran up German flags and the foremost ship launched a torpedo at Columbia but missed. Barbados opened fire and soon afterwards another torpedo hit Columbia on the port side below the wheelhouse and Columbia sank. Two torpedoes passed close to Barbados and the trawlers were engaged by machine-gun and artillery fire. Chirsit and Miura opened fire at long range and one of the torpedo boats turned towards Chirsit. Despite being slower and outgunned the trawler crews fought on; the captain of Barbados was wounded early in the action and Domville took over in the wheelhouse. The Germans fired at the wheelhouse, wounding Domville with splinters and knocked him down several times. Barbados steamed closer but the Germans got the engine going and both torpedo-boats withdrew to the south-south-east.

Thirty minutes after the German ships moved off, Barbados, with its gun and siren, attracted the attention of the destroyer Leonidas, which arrived from the south-west and with the other three destroyers promptly began to chase the two German torpedo boats. Barbados began a search for survivors from Columbia to find that Miura had rescued the only survivor, a deckhand. The survivor reported that Columbia had broken in two when torpedoed and sank almost immediately, the Germans continuing to fire at men in the water. The four British destroyers began to fire on the German torpedo-boats at long range and sank them about an hour after opening fire. The destroyers rescued 46 survivors from the German ships of 59 crewmen, who related how they had taken three men from Columbias crew and locked them away, failing to release them as the ship sank. Schoemann was one of the casualties and the British destroyers suffered no damage.

Aftermath

Analysis

The loss of the torpedo boats showed Schroeder the severe limitations of the A-class torpedo boats; they were too poorly armed for raiding and the boats were relegated to coastal patrols. The defeat at Noordhinder allowed Schroeder's pleas for reinforcements finally to be heard by the German Admiralty and on 22 May another six A-class torpedo boats were placed on order for Flanders.  Kurt Assman was transferred to command of the Flanders Flotilla torpedo boats which was split into two half-flotillas. The next engagement involving an A-class torpedo boat on 22 August against two French destroyers in which A15 damaged one destroyer but was sunk with the loss of fifteen of the crew of 27, reinforced the perception that the class was too slow and under-gunned. Several new boats were put in reserve to provide crews for s ,  and  transferred from the III Torpedo Boat Flotilla that November.

The British took the incident to be a hit-and-run attack, assuming that the seaplane patrol that morning had alerted Zeebrugge and had led to the German sortie against the trawlers. The 3-pounder gun on Barbados had been well handled by Petty Officer A. H. Hallett and that the deck and engine-room crews had shown great courage. Miura and Chirsit were commended for the effectiveness of their long-range fire, which had been of great support to Barbados and forced the Germans to retire. The Admiralty passed on its appreciation to the trawlers for fighting a superior force so vigorously.

Casualties
British losses included Columbia sunk and Barbados damaged; Columbia suffered 16 killed with only a deckhand being rescued after the action. The Germans lost A2 and A6 along with 13 men killed (including Schoemann) and 46 rescued and taken prisoner. A scandal ensued after it was discovered from the captured Germans that the three men taken from the sinking Columbia had been locked away below decks on one of the torpedo boats and were abandoned when the German vessel started to sink. The Germans reported that they did not have enough time to get to the British prisoners and were barely able to escape themselves.

Notes

Citations

References

Further reading
 

North Sea operations of World War I
Naval battles of World War I involving the United Kingdom
Naval battles of World War I involving Germany
Conflicts in 1915
May 1915 events